Farmer Wants a Wife is a reality television series developed by Fremantle Media. The basic structure of the programme is that a number of farmers are presented with women from the city, from whom they choose one to be their spouse. The first edition premièred in the United Kingdom on ITV in 2001. However, the original format of the programme is likely to date back to the TV programme Bauer sucht Bäuerin, which was broadcast in 1983 on SF DRS in Switzerland.

Some versions have also occasionally included gay or women farmers who were seeking husbands.

History
After its UK debut in 2001, the show had more than 10 localised versions around the world, with mixed ratings reports. It was the No. 1 television show for stations that aired it in Belgium and Norway, and was the highest rated (up to 60%) entertainment show in the Netherlands.

Premiered in spring 2008, the U.S. version of Farmer Wants a Wife consists of 8 episodes, during which 10 women are trying to be chosen by just one bachelor farmer. In this the U.S. version differed from the other international versions and it was more fictionalised.

In September 2009, Farmer Wants a Wife returned to British television for a series on Channel 5, presented by singer and television personality Louise Redknapp.

Transmissions

International versions

References

External links
 FremantleMedia's Site
 
 - Links about FWW

British dating and relationship reality television series
2000s British game shows
2000s British reality television series
2001 British television series debuts
2009 British television series endings
Channel 5 (British TV channel) reality television shows
ITV reality television shows
Television series by Fremantle (company)
British television series revived after cancellation
Works about farmers